Cool Hand Luke is a novel by Donn Pearce published in 1965. It was adapted into the 1967 film Cool Hand Luke.

The story is told in a first-person narrative from the perspective of a convict in a central Florida prison. He works on a chain gang maintaining the berms of highways. He recounts the story of a "legendary" fellow inmate whose nickname is Cool Hand Luke.

The novel is based on Pearce's personal experiences while incarcerated with a Florida prison road gang.

History
Donn Pearce was busted for burglary and served two years at Raiford State Prison in central Florida, from 1949-1951, working hard labor on a road gang. At night, he began writing down some of the stories he saw and heard. He also began reading more seriously, such as Faulkner's Sanctuary. According to Pearce, about a third of Cool Hand Luke is his own story, a third is based on the stories he heard while doing time at Raiford, and another third is pure fiction. In 1959 after gaining freedom, Pearce broke a leg in a motorcycle accident and with time available decided to begin writing the novel based on his prison notes and memories. He wrote and re-wrote it six times over a six-year period. He had trouble finding a publisher, Fawcett Books finally agreed to publish the novel as a 'paperback original', paying Pearce $2,500. Scribners then published it as a hardback.

Style
The writing style is unusual in that although there is dialogue, and all quotes are indented paragraphs, they are not encased in quotation marks as is typical in English-language literature.

The most oft-repeated quote from the film, "What we've got here is a failure to communicate", never appeared in the novel. Pearce said the guards were "100% redneck" without multi-syllable vocabularies who would have never said such an intellectually astute phrase.

Reviews
A contemporary review in Kirkus Reviews called it "A kind of classic small tall story (in latrine language)".

Adaptations
The novel was adapted to film in 1967, based on a screenplay by Pearce. It was nominated for an Academy Award for Best Adapted Screenplay.

Stage and screen actor Mark Hammer performed an audiobook rendition in 1991 for Recorded Books.

A stage adaption by Emma Reeves produced by Andrew Loudon and starring Marc Warren and Richard Brake, based on the novel not the film, premiered at Aldwych Theatre in London in 2011.

References

1965 American novels
American novels adapted into films
Charles Scribner's Sons books
Novels set in Florida
Novels set in prison